The International Cooperative Program for Innovative Talents (ICPIT) mechanism is the top-level international educational exchange program for higher education of the Ministry of Education of the People's Republic of China. The ICPIT program is administered by the China Scholarship Council.

Scope
The ICPIT program was established in 2014 with the objective of supporting China's objectives of technology development and of building top-tier interdisciplinary educational programs. Training in innovation is a special focus. The program supports China's aim of developing select universities and disciplines through the Double First Class University Plan. The strategy calls for collaboration with "world class" academic institutions, research laboratories, and research institutions beyond China.

Selection
ICPIT proposals involve collaboration between a Chinese university and foreign entity, and are limited to one proposal per Chinese university. Double First Class universities are permitted a total of three applications per year. In 2018, the Chinese Ministry of Education funded a total of 29 ICPIT programs.

References

External links
 Official Site

Education in China
Higher education in China
Academic awards in China